Arctostaphylos glandulosa, with the common name Eastwood's manzanita, is a species of manzanita.

Distribution
This shrub is native to the coastal slopes of western North America from Oregon through California to Baja California.

Description
Arctostaphylos glandulosa is an erect shrub reaching up to 2.5 meters in height. It is bristly and sometimes glandular, secreting sticky oils. It is quite variable in appearance and there are several subspecies scattered across its range.

Subspecies
Subspecies include:
Arctostaphylos glandulosa ssp. adamsii — Adams' manzanita: endemic to the Peninsular Ranges in San Diego County and Baja California. 
Arctostaphylos glandulosa ssp. crassifolia —  Del Mar manzanita: native to the San Diego and Baja coastlines.
Arctostaphylos glandulosa ssp. cushingiana — Cushing manzanita: native to coastal ranges, from Baja California through California to Oregon.  CalFlora: subsp. cushingiana.
Arctostaphylos glandulosa ssp. gabrielensis — San Gabriel manzanita: endemic to the San Gabriel Mountains in Southern California.
Arctostaphylos glandulosa ssp. glandulosa — Eastwood's manzanita: native to coastal ranges, from Baja California through California to Oregon.
Arctostaphylos glandulosa ssp. howellii — Zaca lake manzanita: native to the Santa Lucia Range in Monterey and San Luis Obispo Countes, and Santa Barbara County
Arctostaphylos glandulosa ssp. leucophylla — from the San Bernardino Mountains through the Peninsular Ranges of Southern California and Baja California.
Arctostaphylos glandulosa ssp. mollis — native to the San Bernardino Mountains, San Gabriel Mountains, Santa Monica Mountains, and Santa Ynez Mountains (Transverse Ranges) in Southern California.

The rare Arctostaphylos glandulosa ssp. crassifolia is federally listed as an endangered species in the United States. There are about 25 remaining populations, most occurring in fragmented and degraded coastal sage scrub chaparral habitats on both sides of the border. Arctostaphylos glandulosa ssp. gabrielensis is only known in the wild from one population near the Mill Creek Summit divide within the Angeles National Forest in the San Gabriel Mountains, and is on the California Native Plant Society Rare and Endangered Plant Inventory.

See also
California chaparral and woodlands

References

External links
 Calflora Database: Arctostaphylos glandulosa (Eastwood manzanita)
Jepson Manual eFlora (TJM2) treatment of Arctostaphylos glandulosa
USDA Plants Profile for Arctostaphylos glandulosa (Eastwood's manzanita)
U.C. Photos gallery:  Arctostaphylos glandulosa

glandulosa
Flora of California
Flora of Baja California
Flora of Oregon
Natural history of the California chaparral and woodlands
Natural history of the California Coast Ranges
Natural history of the Peninsular Ranges
Natural history of the San Francisco Bay Area
Natural history of the Santa Monica Mountains
Natural history of the Transverse Ranges
Taxa named by Alice Eastwood